Islamia hadei is a species of small freshwater snail with a gill and an operculum, an aquatic gastropod mollusc or micromollusc in the family Hydrobiidae.

Taxonomic note
Fauna Europaea recognises two subspecies : Islamia hadei subsp. hadei (E. Gittenberger 1982) and Islamia hadei subsp. molai (A. Reischutz & P.L. Reischutz 2008).

Geographic distribution
I. hadei is endemic to Greece, where it where it is only known from a small spring 5 km southwest of Githion.

Conservation status
This species is currently classified by the IUCN as critically endangered and possibly extinct. The spring it was originally recorded from is being used to provide water for domestic purposes and recent surveys have failed to find any specimens; however, it may still survive in groundwater or a small remnant of the spring.

See also
List of non-marine molluscs of Greece

References

Hydrobiidae
Islamia
Molluscs of Europe
Endemic fauna of Greece
Gastropods described in 1982